The National Mining Museum of Luxembourg is located in the very south of the country, in Rumelange, which is close to the French border. It provides an on-site exhibition of the tools, machinery, and equipment used from the beginning of the 19th century until the iron-ore mines were closed in the 1980s. Many of the exhibits are deep down in the mine, which can be visited during the summer months.

The collection

While most of the museum's collection is in the mine, the exhibition hall contains a number of display cases with a selection of lamps, tools, helmets and measuring instruments as well as minerals and fossils. There are also old maps and documents.

The Kirchberg and Walert mine is accessed by train. The rail terminal, 90 metres below the surface, is the start of a 650-metre circuit through tunnels three metres high and from three to five metres wide. Many of the tools are of considerable historical value. The collection includes rare old boring hammers and drilling machines as well as more modern pneumatic drills. The complex array of tunnels also gives an impressive picture of the mine workings.

Opening times

The museum is open in the afternoon on Thursday, Friday, Saturday and Sunday from April to October. In July and August, it is also open on Tuesday and Wednesday afternoons. Special arrangements can be made for groups throughout the year.

See also
 List of museums in Luxembourg

References

External links
National Mining Museum website

Tourist attractions in Luxembourg
Mining
Mining museums in Luxembourg